Döşemealtı is a municipality and district governorate in Greater Antalya, Turkey. Antalya is one of the 30 metropolitan centers in Turkey with more than one municipality within city borders. Now in Antalya there are five second-level municipalities in addition to Greater Antalya (büyükşehir) municipality. According to 2012 figures the urban population of Döşemealtı is 32465  Together with rural area the total population is 47497. The name of the city refers to ancient road around the town (In Turkish Döşeme means "pavement" ) Döşemealtı is a recent settlement. The earliest residents were from Korkuteli (Burdur Province) in 1934. Later people from Cyprus and Yörüks (nomadic Turkmens) were also settled in Döşemealtı. It was declared as seat of township in 1972 and a district center within Greater Antalya in 1998.

References and notes 

Populated places in Antalya Province